This is a list of actors and actresses who have had roles on the soap opera One Life to Live.  For a full historical character listing, see List of One Life to Live characters.

Cast members

Celebrity guests

External links

One Life to Live
One Life to Live